"Take Back" is a song recorded by Japanese singer-songwriter Kumi Koda, taken as her debut and lead single from her first studio album Affection (2002). It was released on December 6, 2000 via Rhythm Zone in two physical editions; a CD single and 12" vinyl. Additionally, Sounday and Orpheus Records distributed the song in North America in May 2001 with four more formats, but was remixed as a dance number by Jonathan Peters. The track was written by Koda herself, composed by Kazuhito Kikuchi and produced by Max Matsuura. The result was finalized after she had won a competition to find another artist for the Avex Trax company, which later published Rhythm Zone under Matsuura's guidance.

Musically, "Take Back" is an R&B number that incorporates elements of pop and electronic instrumentation, such as keyboards and synthesizers. Her inspiration towards the track was based on her interest with J-pop, and their revolving culture with the R&B scene, particularly with her admiration of label mate M-flo. Because an English version was adapted for the Jonathan Peters' remix, she re-wrote it with Kikuchi. Upon its release, the single received positive reviews from music critics, who commended the sound and production, but understood its lack of general interest with the Japanese market.

Commercially, "Take Back" experienced minimal success in Japan, reaching number 59 on the Oricon Singles Chart. Despite its lower peak, it fared better in the United States, where it charted inside the Dance Club Songs, Dance/Electronic Singles Sales and Hot Single Sales categories, all published by Billboard. In order to promote the single, Koda featured in its accompanying music video, directed by Toku, which featured her in various rooms with back-up dancers and singing the track. Furthermore, the singer performed it on various concert tours such as Best: First Things Live, Black Cherry and her 10th Anniversary tour, and made an appearance on her greatest hits album Best: First Things (2004).

Background and conception

In 2000, Koda auditioned for the Avex Trax competition "Dream Audition", and came second out of 120,000 female participants. Subsequently, Avex employed Japanese producer Max Matsuura to start-up a new sub-label in 1999, named Rhythm Zone, whilst still working with frequent female collaborators Ayumi Hamasaki and Namie Amuro. That same year, Avex appointed Koda to the Matsuura, and he eventually signed her to the label that same year. Her label had hired composer and arranger Kazuhito Kikuchi to compose "Take Back", but Avex instructed Koda to take singing lessons every weekend in Tokyo, Japan before recording it. At that time, she stated that she didn't feel "anxious" about the situation, having already spent 500,000 yen (approximately $4056 USD) she won from the open audition towards food.

However, Avex refused to promote Koda's work equally due to her excessive weight gain, and claims of her being "ugly". Matsuura was also unimpressed by Koda's image, declaring that they had tried to look for "the best one" for their label. Later on the stages, Avex executives threatened to fire Koda if no improvements were put into place, which she eventually did but wasn't notified until her single "Real Emotion/1000 no Kotoba". In mid 2000, Kumi was asked by Avex to make her promotional debut through a photo shoot with photographer Toku, which led to the shooting of the cover sleeve for "Take Back". The artwork features her sporting a red and gold outfit, standing outside of a tunnel. According to Toku, he said "during the shooting of the cover for [her] single, 'Take Back', no one had told [her] what the shoot was for, so [she] just stood in front of the camera clueless".

Composition
"Take Back" was written by Kumi herself, composed by Kazuhito Kikuchi and produced by Max Matsuura. It was recorded at Avex and On Air Azabu Studios in Tokyo, Japan through mid-2000, whilst the sound and arrangement was handled by H-wonder. Musically, it is an R&B number that incorporates elements of pop and electronic instrumentation, such as keyboards and synthesizers. In a biographic article by Yahoo! Music Japan, an editor described it as a "blend of pop and R&B". Similarly, Krzysztof Figlerowicz called it a "soft R&B and pop song." During an interview with Nippop, Kumi said her earlier work was strictly R&B. Through the early stages of the song's parent album Affection (2002), she had only listened to Japanese music and enjoyed reading the lyrics. The singer also expressed her admiration with fellow label mate M-flo, whom was heavily into R&B, and wanted to "emulate" his style. However, executives at Rhythm Zone and Avex instructed her to infuse Western music into her work for a much wider musical influence, as she refused to approach the style at the start. For the North American release, Kumi (going only by her surname, Koda) re-recorded the song in English, and it was remixed by American DJ and producer Jonathan Peters. According to Kumi, "[they] hadn't really intended to release [the remix], but remixes were all the rage then". Particularly, Avex's New York office confessed that they thought the remix would do well thought the club scene.

Reception
"Take Back" received positive reviews from music critics. In an article of Jame World, Krzysztof Figlerowicz was positive towards it sound, labelling it very "pleasant". However, he did note that the composition was more suitable for the American audience than the Japanese music scene, hence the lack of success and "commercial appeal" in the latter region. Similarly, a contributing editor of CD Journal praised the song's longevity and R&B sound, and labelled it "impressive". An editor from Yahoo! Music Japan wrote on Koda's biography that the mixture of pop and R&B music was a "perfect balance of contemporary charm and vocals." Adam Greenberg, a writer of AllMusic, did not mention the original recording, but wrote about the Sunset in Ibiza remix from her remix album Koda Kumi Driving Hit's (2006), and stated: "When the DJs complement her voice just right, Koda can sound like any number of other singers. [...] "Real Emotion" and "Take Back" come out as something very similar to Ayumi Hamasaki's works."

Upon its release, Koda felt insecure about the singles commercial performance, fearing about its first week sales and peak position. To an extent, "Take Back" experienced minor impact in Japan. It debuted at number 62 on the weekly Oricon Singles Chart with over 4,000 units sold in its first week, and peaked at number 59 in its following charting phase. Oricon ranked the song as her lowest-performing single on their chart, and is one of her only singles to miss the top 40; it has sold over 22,680 units in that region. Similarly, it opened at number 66 on the Count Down TV chart and peaked at number 63 the following week.

In the United States, the Jonathan Peter's remix in English experienced success on the Billboard charts. The single entered the Dance Club Songs chart at number 33, making her one of the first Japanese acts to enter on any Billboard affiliated chart in years. The remix move 15 positions forward to its peak position of number 18, and was reconginized as the "greatest gainer"—dated on May 5, 2001; it spent 13 weeks inside the top 50. "Take Back" reached number 10 on the US Hot Dance Music/Maxi-Singles Sales chart, making her the first Japanese artist to achieve a top ten rank on that chart. Additionally, the maxi single spent a sole week at number 20 on the Hot Singles Sales chart. However, the original mix in Japanese is available to stream on services such as Apple Music and Spotify.

Music video

The accompanying music video for "Take Back" was directed by Toku, and took one day to shoot and two days to edit. According to Figlerowicz, who reviewed the singers' DVD compilation 7 Spirits, the video opens with a "young Koda Kumi that has long and black hair. She presents herself in this video in two different ways. In the first one, though wearing a leather dress, she looks natural, gentle and pretty. In the latter one, she is presented with disheveled hair and strange things plaited in it, but despite that, she still attracts the viewer's attention with her enthusiasm flowing out from the screen." In the video, Kumi is accompanied by her three fellow background dancers; they're dancing in a white photo shoot room, while she is sitting in a white chair. Figlerowicz stated that the dancers complimented the early 2000s music video era: "there are only three dancers near the singer, so it probably wouldn't distinguish from other PVs of the same era." Scenes interspersed through the main video show Koda lying nude on a crimson red Ferrari and clutching a microphone in her hand. Figlerowicz commented that the video, in conjunction with her other videos on 7 Spirits, "didn't appeal to the Japanese audience's tastes [...]. With some time, people's opinions of them might change, but they are worth taking a look at.

Live performances and other appearances
"Take Back" has been included on numerous track lists of tours conducted by Koda Kumi. She included the single on her Secret First Class Limited Live tour, Koda Kumi Live Tour 2005: First Things tour, Live Tour 2007: Black Cherry, 10th Anniversary tour, her 2009 Taiwan concert tour, and the Premium Show: Love and Songs tour. The track was featured on Koda's 2005 greatest hits album, Best: First Things. "Take Back" was featured in the televised advertisement for Kracie's Hada-bisei facials.

Track listing

Japanese 12 inch Vinyl
 "Take Back" (Main Club Mix) – 4:46
 "Your Song" (Original Mix) – 5:20

US 12 inch Vinyl
 "Take Back" (Junior's Pop Club Anthem) – 7:07
 "Take Back" (Junior's Dub Anthem) – 7:07
 "Take Back" (Jonathan Peters' Club Mix) – 6:29
 "Take Back" (Jonathan Peters' Sound Factory Dub) – 10:26

US Maxi-single
 "Take Back" (Jonathan Peters' Radio Mix) – 3:31
 "Take Back" (Hex Hector Main Radio Remix) 
 "Take Back" (Junior's Radio Mix) – 3:47
 "Take Back" (C. "Tricky" Stewart Remix) – 4:38
 "Take Back" (Hex Hector Main Club Remix) 
 "Take Back" (Jonathan Peters' Club Mix) – 6:29
 "Take Back" (Junior's Pop Club Anthem) – 7:07
 "Take Back" (Junior's Pop Dub Anthem) – 7:07
 "Take Back" (Jonathan Peters' Sound Factory Dub) – 10:26
 "Take Back" (Hex Hector Dub Remix) – 7:43

Japanese CD single
 "Take Back" (Original Mix) – 4:57
 "Your Song" (Original Mix) – 5:20
 "Take Back" (C. "Tricky" Stewart Remix) – 4:38
 "Take Back" (Daylight Remix) – 4:28
 "Take Back" (Instrumental) – 4:57
 "Your Song" (Instrumental) – 5:20

US CD Single
 "Take Back" (Jonathan Peters' Radio Mix) – 3:31
 "Take Back" (Junior's Radio Mix) – 3:47
 "Take Back" (C. "Tricky" Stewart Remix) – 4:38
 "Take Back" (Jonathan Peters' Club Mix) – 6:29
 "Take Back" (Junior's Pop Club Anthem) – 7:07
 "Take Back" (Jonathan Peters' Sound Factory Dub) – 10:26

Take Back/Trust Your Love Blackwatch Remix 12" Vinyl
 "Trust Your Love" (Blackwatch Remix) – 7:49
 "Take Back" (Blackwatch Remix) – 7:29

Credits and personnel
Credits adapted from the liner notes of Affection.

Kumi Koda – vocals, background vocals, songwriting
Max Matsuura – producer
Kazuhito Kikuchi – producer, composer
H-Wonder – arranger, composer
Rhythm Zone – management, label
Avex Trax – parent label, management

Charts and sales

Weekly charts

Sales

|-
! scope="row"| Japan (RIAJ)
| 
| 22,680
|-
|}

Notes

References

External links
 Take Back – Kumi Koda's official website

Koda Kumi songs
2000 debut singles
2001 singles
2000 songs
Rhythm Zone singles
Song recordings produced by Max Matsuura
Songs written by Koda Kumi
Songs with music by Kazuhito Kikuchi